Leprocollema is a genus of fungi in the family Lichinaceae. It was circumscribed in 1890 by lichenologist Edvard August Vainio. The genus is monotypic, containing only the single species Leprocollema americanum.

References

Lichinomycetes
Lichen genera
Taxa named by Edvard August Vainio
Taxa described in 1890
Monotypic Ascomycota genera